The 2022 Kuurne–Brussels–Kuurne was the 74th edition of the Kuurne–Brussels–Kuurne cycling classic. It was held on 27 February 2022 as a category 1.Pro race on the 2022 UCI ProSeries. The race formed the latter half of the opening weekend of the Belgian road cycling season with UCI WorldTour race Omloop Het Nieuwsblad held the previous day.

Teams 
Seventeen of the eighteen UCI WorldTeams along with eight UCI ProTeams formed the twenty-five teams that participated in the race. 136 riders finished the race.

UCI WorldTeams

 
 
 
 
 
 
 
 
 
 
 
 
 
 
 
 
 

UCI ProTeams

Result

References

External links 

2022
Kuurne–Brussels–Kuurne
Kuurne–Brussels–Kuurne
Kuurne–Brussels–Kuurne